The Mecklenburg T 7 engines were German, six-coupled, narrow gauge, steam locomotives with the Grand Duchy of Mecklenburg Friedrich-Franz Railway (Großherzoglich Mecklenburgische Friedrich-Franz-Eisenbahn). They were employed on the Bäderbahn between Bad Doberan and Heiligendamm. They replaced the existing vehicles after the line had been extended to 15.4 kilometres to Arendsee. The three engines, which were later given the numbers 99 301 - 99 303 in the 1920s by the Deutsche Reichsbahn, were delivered in 1910, 1911 and 1914. The design of these locomotives was heavily based on those of the Class T 3 from Prussia. Later, two units went to the so-called Rübenbahn ('Turnip Railway'), the branch line from Tangermünde to Lüderitz. No. 99 302 was retired in 1932, the other two were given to the USSR in 1945 as reparations.

See also
Grand Duchy of Mecklenburg Friedrich-Franz Railway 
List of Mecklenburg locomotives

References 

 
 

0-6-0T locomotives
T07
900 mm gauge locomotives
Railway locomotives introduced in 1910
Henschel locomotives
Narrow gauge steam locomotives of Germany
C n2t locomotives
Freight locomotives